The Stillman Pratt House is a historic house at 472 Summer Avenue in Reading, Massachusetts.  The -story wood-frame house, probably built in the late 1840s, is a rare local variant of a combined Federal-Greek Revival style house.  It follows the Federal style of placing the roof gables at the sides, but its roof extends over the front porch, which is supported by four fluted Doric columns.  The house's corner pilasters are decorated with the Greek key motif, and its windows and doors have architrave surrounds with corner blocks.

The house was listed on the National Register of Historic Places in 1984.

See also
National Register of Historic Places listings in Reading, Massachusetts
National Register of Historic Places listings in Middlesex County, Massachusetts

References

Houses on the National Register of Historic Places in Reading, Massachusetts
Houses in Reading, Massachusetts
1840 establishments in Massachusetts